Kuala Telemung is a mukim in Hulu Terengganu District, Terengganu, Malaysia.

Hulu Terengganu District
Mukims of Terengganu